Cuthbert Irvine Peacocke TD (26 April 1903 – 6 April 1994) was the 8th Bishop of Derry and Raphoe, retiring in 1975.

Peacocke was born at St Mary's Rectory, Dublin., son of Rt. Revd Joseph Irvine Peacocke, bishop of Derry and Raphoe 1916–1945.   He was educated at Saint Columba's College, Dublin and Trinity College, Dublin and ordained in 1927 His first post was a curacy at Seapatrick.

He graduated B.A. 1925, M.A. 1929. He was ordained deacon 1926 and was curate of Seapatrick (Dromore) in the period 1926–1930. Between 1930 and 1933 he was head of the Church of Ireland Southern Mission to Belfast, Ballymacarett (Down), the main shipyard parish of east Belfast at the time of the 1920s Depression. He subsequently became Rector of Derriaghy (Connor) 1933–1935; Rector of St Mark's Dundela, Belfast (Down) 1935–1956; Chaplain to the Forces 1939-1945 (serving with the 8th Belfast Heavy Anti-Aircraft Unit in France); private chaplain to the Bishop of Down and Dromore 1945–1956; Rural Dean of Holywood 1948–1950; Archdeacon of Down and Canon of Belfast 1950–1956; Dean and Vicar of Belfast 1956–1970. On 16 October he was appointed by the electoral college as Bishop of Derry and Raphoe and enthroned in St Columb's Cathedral on 22 January 1970. He represented the third generation of his family to the episcopate.

Peacocke was elected Bishop of Derry and Raphoe on 16 October 1969 and consecrated 6 January 1970. He resigned 31 March 1975.

References

1903 births
1994 deaths
People educated at St Columba's College, Dublin
Alumni of Trinity College Dublin
Archdeacons of Down
Deans of Belfast
Bishops of Derry and Raphoe
Anglican archdeacons in Ireland
20th-century Anglican bishops in Ireland
Royal Army Chaplains' Department officers